Petrovsky is a rural locality (a khutor) and the administrative center of Petrovskoye Rural Settlement, Uryupinsky District, Volgograd Oblast, Russia. The population was 2,874 as of 2010. There are 29 streets.

Geography 
Petrovsky is located in steppe, on the left bank of the Kamenka River, 7 km southwest of Uryupinsk (the district's administrative centre) by road. Uryupinsk is the nearest rural locality.

References 

Rural localities in Uryupinsky District